Francisco Castrejón Ramírez (born 11 June 1947) is a Mexican former professional footballer who played as a goalkeeper. He was one of three goalkeepers for Mexico in the 1970 FIFA World Cup, but did not play any games there.

Club career
Born in Tuxpan, Jalisco, Castrejón played club football for UNAM Pumas, Club de Fútbol Laguna, Puebla F.C., Club América, Tampico, F.C. Atlas and Atlético Morelia. He made his senior debut at age 18, appearing for Pumas in a match against Toluca on 3 February 1964.

Castrejón joined Laguna and played for the club in the 1972–73 Primera season. He signed with Puebla for the two following seasons, then joined América in 1975, where he would win the 1975–76 Mexican Primera División season title.

International career
Castrejón made several appearances for the Mexico national football team. He made his debut as a substitute in a friendly against Colombia on 4 February 1969.

References

External links

1947 births
Living people
Footballers from Jalisco
People from Tuxpan, Jalisco
Association football goalkeepers
Mexico international footballers
1970 FIFA World Cup players
Club Universidad Nacional footballers
Club Puebla players
Club América footballers
Tampico Madero F.C. footballers
Atlas F.C. footballers
Atlético Morelia players
Liga MX players
Mexican footballers